Vuk Isaković (fl. 1696-1759) was a Serb military commander in Austrian service during the Austrian-Ottoman Wars. He was the inspiration for the main character, Vuk Isakovič (Вук Исакович), in the Seobe (novel by Miloš Crnjanski).

Vuk's family originated from Sredska, Serbia, then under Ottoman rule. His brother was Trifun Isaković, also a commander. In the novel Seobe, Vuk's brother is a merchant named Aranđel, who has an affair with Vuk's wife Dafina.

The Serbs established a Hajduk army that supported the Austrians. The army was divided into 18 companies, in four groups. In this period, the most notable obor-kapetans were Vuk Isaković from Crna Bara, Mlatišuma from Kragujevac and Kosta Dimitrijević from Paraćin. With his brother Trifun he commanded the Hajduks who devastated Lešnica. After the war he had the rank of captain. His brother became major in Syrmia, then lieutenant colonel of the Petrovaradin regiment. He and his brother were among the main contributors for the new church and tower-bell of the Šišatovac monastery. Isaković participated in the Austro-Russian–Turkish War (1735–39).

He died in 1759, at the age of 65, in Mitrovica. He was buried at Šišatovac, which at the time was some type of mausoleum for notable Serbs.

See also
 Jovan Monasterlija (fl. 1689-1706), Serbian military commander in Austrian service
 Pavle Nestorović
 Subota Jović
 Sekula Vitković
 Novak Petrović
 Pane Božić
 Antonije Znorić
 Serbian Militia
 Paul Davidovich (1737–1814), Austrian general
 Atanasije Rašković
 Radonja Petrović

References

Sources

18th-century Serbian people
Serbian military leaders
Austrian soldiers
Kosovo Serbs
Serbs of Vojvodina
1759 deaths
Year of birth unknown
Habsburg Serbs
People from Prizren
Hajduks
Refugees of the Great Turkish War